The Halal Inn was an alcohol free inn and temperance bar in the United Kingdom. It was designed for Muslims.  It is located in Oldham, Lancashire and opened in December 2007. It was owned by Azizur Rahman and Muzahid Khan. They bought and converted the Westwood Inn to the Halal Inn. The bar served soft drinks, fruit juice, non-alcoholic spritzers, tea, and coffee but no alcohol.

The inn also was home to a restaurant that serves traditional Asian and Middle Eastern food such as poppadoms, chicken pakora, seekh kebabs and the lamb dish saag gosht. There was also a steam room and a prayer room. The inn ran a snooker league, a Carrom league, and a monthly Islamic quiz night.  Although the customers were predominantly male and Muslim, people of all backgrounds could frequent the inn.

Cited as closed down, owner 'gone away'.

References

Buildings and structures in Oldham
Pubs in Greater Manchester
Halal restaurants
Temperance movement